Christian Gyldenløve, Count of Samsøe (Copenhagen, 28 February 1674 – Odense, 16 July 1703), was a Danish nobleman and military officer. He was one of five illegitimate children fathered by Christian V of Denmark with Sophie Amalie Moth. 

He distinguished himself in both foreign and Danish-Norwegian military service and established himself as the Danish Count Danneskiold-Samsøe, which descended from his second marriage. 

In Copenhagen on 27 November 1696 Christian married firstly his second cousin Countess Charlotte Amalie Danneskiold-Laurvig (15 November 1682 – 7 December 1699), a daughter of Ulrik Frederik Gyldenløve. They had two daughters:
Christiane Charlotte (Copenhagen, 7 July 1698 – Akershus, 5 October 1699)
Frederikke Louise (Akershus, 2 October 1699 – Sønderborg, 2 December 1744), married on 21 July 1720 to her kinsman Christian August, Duke of Schleswig-Holstein-Sonderburg-Augustenburg

In Copenhagen on 25 May 1701 Christian married secondly Dorothea Krag (27 September 1675 – Gisselfeld, 10 October 1754). They had two sons:
Christian, Lensgreve af Danneskiold-Samsøe (Verona, 1 August 1702 – Copenhagen, 17 February 1728)
Frederik, Count of Danneskiold-Samsøe (Assendrup, 1 November 1703 – Aarhus, 18 July 1770)

After his death, his widow assumed his post of royal General Postmaster.

Ancestry

External links
Danneskiold at Den Store Dansk Encyklopædi

1674 births
1703 deaths
17th-century Danish people
18th-century Danish people
18th-century Danish landowners
Illegitimate children of Danish monarchs
County governors of Norway
Sons of kings